Joel Indermitte (born 27 December 1992) is a retired Estonian footballer and current football manager. He played the position of centre back.

International career
Indermitte is a member of the Estonia national under-19 football team and former member of Estonia national under-17 football team. In June 2011, he was called up to Estonia to face Chile and Uruguay. He was one of eight players that debuted against Chile on 19 June 2011, when the team lost 0–4.

References

External links
 

1992 births
Living people
Estonian footballers
Estonia under-21 international footballers
Estonia international footballers
FC Flora players
Viljandi JK Tulevik players
FC Viljandi players
FC Elva players
FC Warrior Valga players
Footballers from Tallinn
Estonian expatriate footballers
Estonian expatriate sportspeople in Spain
Expatriate footballers in Spain
Association football defenders
Atarfe Industrial CF players
FC Kuressaare players
Estonia youth international footballers
Estonian football managers